The World Weightlifting Championships 2009 was held in Goyang, South Korea. The event took place from November 20 to November 29, 2009.

Medal summary

Men

Women

Medal table 
Ranking by Big (Total result) medals

Ranking by all medals: Big (Total result) and Small (Snatch and Clean & Jerk)

Team ranking

Men

Women

Participating nations
329 competitors from 65 nations competed.

References
IWF Annual Book 2009

External links
Official website
Results 

 
W
World Weightlifting Championships
World Weightlifting Championships
W
Sports competitions in Goyang
November 2009 sports events in South Korea